Shafa Rud (also Romanized as Shafā Rūd; also known as Reshteh-e-Tālesh, Shiffarūd, and Sīāh Rūd) is a village in Gil Dulab Rural District, in the Central District of Rezvanshahr County, Gilan Province, Iran. At the 2006 census, its population was 255, in 72 families.

References 

Populated places in Rezvanshahr County